Gustave Nicolas Bertinot (23 June 1822, Louviers - 19 April 1888, Paris) was a French engraver. He was primarily known for his intaglio work.

Biography 

He was born to Augustin Victor Bertinot, a drape manufacturer, and his wife Françoise Aurore, née Lelièvre. A childhood injury to his hip left him with a limp. He showed an early aptitude for drawing and, after completing his primary studies, decided to become an engraver. At the age of fifteen, his parents agreed to enroll him in classes taught by Hippolyte Pauquet.

Finally, he finished his studies with Michel Martin Drolling and Achille-Louis Martinet. The latter was especially supportive; helping him to prepare for a major competition in 1848. He won the award for engraving at the Prix de Rome in 1850, spending several years at the Villa Medici.

Upon returning, he established a studio in Paris on the Rue de la Pompe. Their son, Émile Bertinot (1864-1936), was a jurist who served as Mayor of Meudon

He was named a Knight in the Legion of Honor in 1867, and a professor of engraving at the École des Beaux-Arts in 1875. His students included . In 1878. he was elected to the Académie des Beaux-Arts, where he took Seat #4 for engraving, succeeding his former teacher, Martinet, who had died the year before.

He was interred at the Cimetière du Montparnasse, and his eulogy was delivered by Oscar Roty.

References

Further reading
 Charles de Franqueville, Le Premier Siècle de l'Institut de France, Vol.I, Paris, Rothschild, 1895, #853
 Henri Delaborde and William Bouguereau, Funérailles de M. Bertinot, membre de l'Académie, le samedi 21 avril 1888, Académie des Beaux-Arts (Online @ Gallica)

External links 

1822 births
1888 deaths
French engravers
Prix de Rome winners
Recipients of the Legion of Honour
Members of the Académie des beaux-arts
People from Louviers